William Henry Harrison Cash (July 19, 1843August 13, 1924) was an American businessman and Republican politician.  He was a member of the Wisconsin State Assembly, representing northern Juneau County during the 1877 session.

Early life and war service

Born in Flushing, Belmont County, Ohio, Cash moved with his parents to New Lisbon, Wisconsin, in 1861.  At age 20, he enlisted for service in the Union Army and was enrolled in the 10th Independent Battery Wisconsin Light Artillery.  He served with his battery in the western theater of the war, and saw significant combat in Sherman's campaigns through Atlanta, Savannah, and the Carolinas.  He marched in the Grand Review of the Armies and mustered out with his regiment in June 1865.

Career
After returning to Wisconsin, he was engaged as a livestock and produce dealer. Cash was also involved with the coal, insurance, banking, and railroad businesses. He helped found (co-founded) the village of Cashton, Wisconsin. Cash was the postmaster for New Lisbon and served on the Juneau County, Wisconsin, board of supervisors. In 1877, Cash served in the Wisconsin State Assembly and was a Republican. Cash died of heart failure in New Lisbon, Wisconsin.

Electoral history

Wisconsin Assembly (1876)

| colspan="6" style="text-align:center;background-color: #e9e9e9;"| General Election, November 7, 1876

References

1843 births
1924 deaths
People from Flushing, Ohio
People from New Lisbon, Wisconsin
People of Wisconsin in the American Civil War
American city founders
Wisconsin postmasters
Businesspeople from Wisconsin
County supervisors in Wisconsin
Republican Party members of the Wisconsin State Assembly